Jeong Chung-gu (born 5 March 1949) is a South Korean speed skater. He competed in two events at the 1972 Winter Olympics.

References

1949 births
Living people
South Korean male speed skaters
Olympic speed skaters of South Korea
Speed skaters at the 1972 Winter Olympics
Place of birth missing (living people)